William Emmet may refer to:
 William Le Roy Emmet (1859–1941), American electrical engineer
 William T. Emmet (1869–1918), American lawyer from New York